Reesimermis is a genus of nematodes belonging to the family Mermithidae.

Species:
 Reesimermis jacutensis Rubzov, 1979
 Reesimermis nielseni Tsai & Grundman, 1969
 Reesimermis pikaninensis Rubzov, 1979

References

Mermithidae
Enoplea genera